Indiana University Health, formerly known as Clarian Health Partners, is a nonprofit healthcare system located in the U.S. state of Indiana. It is the largest and most comprehensive healthcare system in Indiana, with 16 hospitals under its IU Health brand and almost 36,000 employees. It has a partnership with Indiana University School of Medicine. The IU Health system has a total capacity of 2,696 beds.

History
IU Health's creation dates to January 1, 1997 when three Indianapolis hospitals—Methodist Hospital, Riley Hospital for Children and Indiana University Hospital – merged to form Clarian Health Partners. Based in Indianapolis, the hospital system soon grew to include other hospitals and health centers across the state.

In January 2011, Clarian Health adopted the new name of Indiana University Health. The new brand did not change the corporate structure. IU Health remained an independent, nonprofit health system with for-profit entities, with the Methodist Church and Indiana University Board of Trustees as corporate board members.

The system's flagship hospital, IU Health Methodist (originally called Methodist Episcopal Hospital and Deaconess Home), opened in 1908 on the site of a former baseball park.  Two years later the hospital's affiliation with the Indianapolis Motor Speedway began when the city's first motorized ambulance began bringing patients to Methodist from the racetrack. Methodist expanded over the decades and was the site of numerous medical firsts, including the nation's first heart transplant at a private hospital (1982) and Indiana's first double-lung transplant (1995).

Riley Hospital for Children became Indiana's first children's hospital when it opened in 1924, named after Hoosier poet James Whitcomb Riley. The 300-room hospital provides care to more than 300,000 children a year. Nearby Indiana University Hospital opened in 1970 as a teaching hospital affiliated with Indiana University School of Medicine, replacing Long Hospital that had been in operation since 1914.

IU Health's LifeLine helicopter is the oldest air ambulance in Indiana; it began flying in 1979. The IU Health-owned People Mover train, which is open to the public, began running in 2003 on a 1.4-mile dual track that runs above city streets and crosses underneath Interstate 65.  The People Mover ceased operation in February 2019 and was replaced by an extensive shuttle bus system that offers transport between the three (3) downtown hospitals.

The health system launched a major expansion into Indianapolis’ suburbs in 2005 with the opening of IU Health North and IU Health West hospitals.

In 2008, the health system moved its administrative offices into Fairbanks Hall, a six-story office and clinical studies building constructed along the Indiana Central Canal. Another significant expansion came in 2012 when IU Health opened a $100 million neuroscience building near Methodist Hospital.

In more recent years, IU Health has expanded outpatient services while reducing its hospital holdings. In 2015 it converted IU Health Morgan hospital into an outpatient facility and sold its majority interest in IU Health LaPorte and Starke hospitals in northern Indiana. At the same time, IU Health added physicians’ offices and opened multiple urgent care centers. It also operates insurance plans for employers, families and individuals, including the Medicare-eligible.

In 2016, IU Health announced it would move women's services including maternity care from its Methodist campus to Riley Hospital for Children.

The same year brought the retirement of Daniel F. Evans Jr., who served 14 years as IU Health's second CEO, was a key architect of its creation and growth, and was the fifth generation of his family to serve at IU Health Methodist Hospital. He was replaced by Dennis M. Murphy, a hospital administrator from Chicago who had been groomed as Evans' successor.

Leadership
Indiana University Health has a 14-member board responsible for making sure the health system carries out its mission and approving its budget, long-range plans, medical staff appointments, new services and major policies.

IU Health's executive leadership includes: 
Dennis Murphy, president and chief executive officer: Murphy joined IU Health in 2013 as chief operating officer and was named president in September 2015. On May 1, 2016 he succeeded Daniel F. Evans Jr. as CEO upon Evans' retirement.
Michelle Janney, PhD, RN, executive vice president & chief operating officer: Janney joined IU Health in 2015.

University Health System Consortium
For four consecutive years, IU Health Methodist Hospital has been recognized as one of the nation's best academic medical centers by the University HealthSystem Consortium. Of 98 academic medical centers included in the analysis, IU Health Methodist Hospital is one of five to earn the Quality Leadership Award. Academic Medical Centers were assessed across a broad spectrum of care including safety, timeliness, effectiveness, efficiency, equity and patient-centeredness.

Magnet designation
Arnett Hospital as well as Arnett Ambulatory sites, West Hospital, Ball Hospital, Bloomington Hospital, Methodist Hospital, University Hospital, and Riley Hospital for Children have been designated as Magnet hospital systems by the American Nurses Credentialing Center in recognition of excellence in nursing care.

Locations
Indiana University Health hospitals include:
Indiana University Health Arnett Hospital (Lafayette)
Indiana University Health Arnett Hospital Hospice (Lafayette)
Indiana University Health Ball Memorial Hospital (Muncie)
Indiana University Health Bedford Hospital (Bedford)
Indiana University Health Blackford Hospital (Hartford City)
Indiana University Health Bloomington Hospital (Bloomington)
Indiana University Health Frankfort Hospital (Frankfort)
Indiana University Health Jay Hospital (Portland)
Indiana University Health Methodist Hospital (Indianapolis)
Indiana University Health North Hospital (Carmel)
Indiana University Health Paoli Hospital (Paoli)
Indiana University Health Saxony Hospital (Fishers)
Indiana University Health Tipton Hospital (Tipton)
Indiana University Health University Hospital (Indianapolis)
Indiana University Health West Hospital (Avon)
Indiana University Health White Memorial Hospital (Monticello)
Indiana University Health Riley Hospital for Children (Indianapolis)
Riley Hospital for Children at Indiana University Health North Hospital (Carmel)

IU Health has two of the Level I Trauma Centers in the state of Indiana - IU Health Methodist Hospital (adult) and Riley Hospital for Children at Indiana University Health (pediatric). IU Health's Trauma Centers include multidisciplinary teams of board-certified physicians, nurses and technicians available onsite to treat the most severely injured patients at all times. IU Health Arnett Hospital became Indiana's first level 3 verified trauma center in April 2013.

Statistics
Systemwide admissions (2015): 129,612
Outpatient visits: 2,911,610
Staffed beds: 2,817
Full-time equivalent employees: 29,179
Medical staff: 2,812

References

External links
Official website

Healthcare in Indiana
Hospital networks in the United States
Medical and health organizations based in Indiana
Non-profit organizations based in Indianapolis